Alexander Albon Ansusinha (born 23 March 1996) is a Thai-British racing driver currently competing in Formula One for Williams Racing, under the Thai flag. Albon previously raced in Formula One for Scuderia Toro Rosso and Red Bull Racing and in DTM for AF Corse.

After becoming part of the Red Bull Junior Team in 2012, he was promoted to open-wheel cars for the 2012 Eurocup Formula Renault 2.0 season. He spent three years in the series and finished third in the 2014 championship. He moved to the FIA Formula 3 European Championship in 2015, where he finished seventh. He signed with ART Grand Prix to contest the 2016 GP3 Series and ended the season as runner-up behind teammate Charles Leclerc.

In 2017 Albon moved up to the FIA Formula 2 Championship with ART, where he finished his maiden year tenth in the standings. After twelve races, Albon was promoted to Red Bull Racing, partnering Max Verstappen and replacing Pierre Gasly. He took his first podium finish – and the first in a World Championship Formula One race for a Thai driver – at the 2020 Tuscan Grand Prix.

Personal life
Albon was born at the Portland Hospital in London, England on 23 March 1996. His father, Nigel Albon is a former British racing driver who participated in the British Touring Car Championship and Porsche Carrera Cup. His mother, Kankamol, is from Thailand.

Growing up in Bures, Suffolk alongside a younger brother, Luca, and three sisters, Chloe, Zoe and Alicia, Albon attended Ipswich School before leaving to pursue his professional racing career, citing Michael Schumacher and Valentino Rossi as being inspirational figures when he was younger. Albon holds dual British and Thai nationality, and races under the Thai flag. Albon is known to practise Buddhism.

Albon and his family own a number of pets, consisting of eight cats, a dog and a horse. He has been publicly dating Chinese LPGA golfer Lily He since 2019.

Early career

Karting 
Albon started competitively racing karts in 2005 at the age of 8, competing locally and winning his local Hoddesdon Championship. In 2006 Albon started racing in the cadet class, finishing 1st at the Kartmasters British Grand Prix and participating in the Super 1 National Honda Cadet Championship finishing 1st in 2006 and 2nd in 2007. In 2008 he moved up to the KF3 class where he stayed until 2010. During this time Albon won the Kartmasters British Grand Prix, Formula Kart Stars Championship, KF Winter Series, Super 1 National KF3 Championship, CIK-FIA World Cup, and CIK-FIA European Championship. In 2011 Albon graduated to KF1 placing 2nd in the WSK Euro Series and 2nd at the CIK-FIA World Championship.

Formula Renault 2.0

EPIC Racing (2012)
From karting Albon graduated to the Formula Renault 2.0 Eurocup series where he drove for EPIC Racing in 2012 alongside Kevin Giovesi, Konstantin Tereschenko, Kevin Jörg, Dennis Wusthoff and Christof von Grunigen and finished 38th out of 49 in the championship after having a tough year and being unable to score points.

KTR (2013–2014)
In 2013 Albon joined KTR to race in the 2013 Eurocup Formula Renault 2.0 season alongside Yu Kanamaru and Ignazio D'Agosto finishing 16th out of 36 in the championship. Albon managed to secure one fastest lap and one pole position in the 2013 season, both of them coming at the Red Bull Ring in Austria. He finished the 2013 season with 22 points. In 2014 Albon raced alongside Gregor Ramsay, Jules Gounon and Callan O'Keefe and enjoyed a much more successful year. He was once again unable to find a win at any of the 14 races but managed to get one pole position at the Nürburgring and finished 3rd in the drivers' championship with 117 points.

European Formula 3

In 2015, Albon switched to European Formula 3, racing at Signature with teammate Dorian Boccolacci. He finished seventh overall, with two pole positions (scored at the Norisring), 5 podiums (including four rookie wins), and 187 points overall.

GP3 Series
In December 2015, Albon partook in post-season testing with ART Grand Prix. In 2016, Albon raced for ART in the GP3. Albon claimed four wins and finished as runner-up in the championship to teammate Charles Leclerc.

Formula 2 Championship

ART Grand Prix (2017)

In 2017, Albon graduated to the FIA Formula 2 Championship, with ART. His teammate for the season would be Nobuharu Matsushita, who at the time was also signed as a development driver for McLaren. He made his debut in Bahrain, where he started in 9th place on the starting grid for the feature race and finished 6th. For the sprint race, Albon qualified 3rd on the grid, behind Luca Ghiotto and his teammate, Matsushita. However, mechanical problems forced Matsushita to start from the pitlane promoting Albon to second. Albon struggled for grip for the majority of the race and finished in 7th position.

At the Spanish round Albon placed 3rd on the provisional starting grid for the feature race. Charles Leclerc led into turn one, but found himself under fire from Ghiotto and Albon after locking up. Leclerc began to pull away from Ghiotto, who began to fall into the clutches of Albon, who subsequently made a move into turn one and took second place from 
Ghiotto. Leclerc pitted on lap seven, along with Matsushita, leaving Albon with the lead of the race. Sergio Canamasas ground to a halt on lap 10 owing to problems with the car. Despite this, he did not pull off the track to retire – instead remaining on the track and gesturing to the marshals asking for a push-start. The dangerous position of the car initially brought out the virtual safety car and eventually, the safety car itself. As the race resumed, Leclerc and Ghiotto began to scythe through the pack. Oliver Rowland eventually pressured Albon into a mistake to take the lead of the race, although both still had an impending pitstop to make. With the fresh rubber, Albon and Rowland were staging a comeback with both drivers challenging for the podium toward the latter stages of the race, Albon later finished the race in 5th position. In the sprint race, Albon started 4th on the grid and enjoyed a well-fought battle with Leclerc for the majority of the race and after battling for several laps, Leclerc finally passed Albon for fifth place. Later in the race however Albon dropped back, finishing the race in 8th position.

At the Monaco round, Albon qualified second on the grid with a time of 1:19.321 seconds. In qualifying, the grid was separated into two Groups due to safety concerns over the short and tight nature of the circuit. Albon was part of the 'Group B' qualifying and managed to gain the fastest time in that group, only qualifying 12 hundredths of a second behind Leclerc who qualified in Group A. After an aborted start due to Antonio Fuoco and Sean Gelael's engines stalling on the grid, Leclerc led into the first corner, followed by Albon. A concertina effect occurred at the Grand Hotel Hairpin as Canamasas was spun, causing Gelael to lose his front wing and bringing out a local yellow. Later in the race, Albon found himself stuck behind the slower moving Norman Nato and Jordan King, which eventually caused him to lose places, finishing the race in a disappointing 4th position. In the Sprint Race, Albon started 5th on the grid, and after a very tight race, he dropped back to finish in 6th position. Albon missed the Baku round of the Championship due to injury. Albon had sustained a broken collarbone whilst out on a mountain biking training ride, and was unable to compete due to the over-the-shoulder seat belts used in Formula 2.

Albon was back in action for the fifth round of the championship, stating that his initial feeling on returning to action after breaking his collarbone was "a lot better" than he expected. He confirmed that the bone was still "clearly broken" following an x-ray on the Tuesday before the race weekend, and explained that the main issue he is having in the car is a "numb feeling" from the scar he received during successful surgery after the crash. Albon finished the practice session in 8th, which showed that despite the injury, the chance for his first podium in Formula 2 was a possibility. Albon qualified in 4th for the Feature Race, however, he was later promoted to third on the provisional starting grid after Sérgio Sette Câmara was disqualified after the qualifying session after failing to provide the required 1 litre fuel sample. Albon finished the Feature Race in 5th position, after losing places to Oliver Rowland and Nicholas Latifi (both racing for DAMS) whose car proved to have a lot of pace. For the Sprint Race, Albon started the race 4th on the grid and managed to move up the grid to clinch his first podium in Formula 2, finishing behind Artem Markelov. He would later score another podium at the sprint race at the season finale in Abu Dhabi, finishing in second after being overtaken by Leclerc on the final lap. He finished 10th in the drivers' championship in his first F2 season, scoring 86 points.

DAMS (2018)
In April 2018, DAMS announced that they signed Albon for the 2018 season to partner Nicholas Latifi. While initially only confirmed for the opening round, he was later confirmed as a full-time driver for the team the following month. He started the season with fourth place in the feature race in Bahrain before finishing thirteenth in the sprint race.

For the next round in Baku, Albon started from pole for the feature race and followed it up with his first win in F2, while in the sprint race he finished thirteenth again.

At the next two rounds in Barcelona and Monaco, Albon took two more pole positions but finished fifth in the feature race in Spain after getting away slowly while in the sprint he finished second behind Jack Aitken. In Monaco, however, it was a weekend to forget for the Thai driver, as in the feature race, he collided with Nyck de Vries as he was entering the pitlane, spinning him around in the pitlane entrance, while in the sprint race he collided with Campos' Roy Nissany approaching the Nouvelle Chicane.

Another retirement would follow in the feature race at Le Castellet after he suffered an engine failure. In the sprint race, he finished seventh, one place ahead of Latifi. After finishing fifth in both races at the Red Bull Ring, Albon won the feature race at Silverstone, before collecting two more wins at the sprint race at the Hungaroring, and the feature race at Sochi. A stall on the grid in the feature race at Abu Dhabi ended his title chances; he finished fourteenth in the feature race and eighth in the sprint race, leaving him third in the drivers' championship behind fellow future F1 drivers George Russell and Lando Norris.

Formula E 
Albon was signed by Nissan e.dams alongside Sébastien Buemi as one of its drivers for the 2018–19 Formula E season, but he was released before the start of the season to instead drive in the 2019 Formula One season for Toro Rosso.

His place was taken by former F2 colleague Oliver Rowland, who previously competed in the 2015 Punta del Este ePrix as an injury replacement for Mahindra Racing's Nick Heidfeld.

Formula One career

Toro Rosso (2019)

On 26 November 2018, it was announced that Albon had been released from his Nissan e.dams Formula E contract after rumours he was to sign for Scuderia Toro Rosso in Formula One. On the same day, Toro Rosso announced Albon would join the team for  alongside Daniil Kvyat and thus Albon's relationship with Red Bull, which had ended seven years prior, was restored.

A heavy crash in practice for the  forced him to miss qualifying and start the race from the pit lane. He recovered in the race to finish tenth and win the Driver Of The Day award. Damage caused by contact with Antonio Giovinazzi on the first lap of the  later led to Albon's first race retirement.

He and Toro Rosso took advantage of changing weather conditions to run as high as fourth and eventually finish sixth, albeit behind teammate Kvyat who claimed the team's first podium finish in over ten years. At this stage of the season, Albon had scored 16 points to Kvyat's 27.

Red Bull (2019–2021)

2019

On the mid-season change, Red Bull stated: ”The team will use the next nine races to evaluate Alex's performance in order to make an informed decision as to who will drive alongside Max in 2020.”

At the Belgian Grand Prix, Albon was forced to start from seventeenth place due to a power unit change. He recovered to finish fifth in the race after passing Sergio Pérez on the final lap. After sixth-place finishes at the Italian and Singapore Grands Prix, Albon finished fifth at the  having crashed in qualifying and started from the pit lane. He finished fifth at both the Mexican and United States Grands Prix, despite taking damage on the opening lap and making three pit stops at the latter.

Albon ended his debut season eighth in the World Drivers' Championship with 92 points. He received the Rookie of the Year award at the FIA Prize Giving Ceremony.

2020

In the closing stages of the season-opening , Albon was in third place at the safety car restart on new soft-compound tyres, behind the leading Mercedes cars on older hard tyres. Albon attempted to overtake Lewis Hamilton but the two made contact, sending Albon into the gravel. Albon later retired with an electrical failure which engine supplier Honda blamed on the collision. He came under pressure from Racing Point's Sergio Pérez in the final laps of the  but maintained fourth place after the drivers made contact, damaging Pérez's front wing. Red Bull commented that they were unsure why Albon lacked pace in the race.

He received a penalty in the race for causing a collision with Kevin Magnussen and dropped to the back of the field before ultimately finishing eighth. He qualified fifth for the  but finished sixth after being passed by Renault's Esteban Ocon on the final lap. He was fifteenth at the  having taken collision damage and a time penalty on the opening lap.

He took his second Formula One podium at the  after Sergio Pérez retired from third place due to an engine failure, making him the first Asian driver to score more than one podium finish in Formula One.

Albon finished the season seventh in the World Drivers' Championship, scoring 105 of Red Bull's 319 points.

2021 
After finishing his 2021 DTM campaign, he took on a coaching role for AlphaTauri driver Yuki Tsunoda starting from the 2021 Turkish Grand Prix.

Williams (2022–)

2022 

He again started last at the  due to a brake fire in qualifying, but recovered to finish the race eleventh. Albon qualified eighteenth for the inaugural Miami Grand Prix and was classified ninth, his second points score of the season. At the British Grand Prix Albon was involved in an opening lap crash with Yuki Tsunoda and Esteban Ocon after he was hit from behind by Sebastian Vettel. He was hospitalised for precautionary checks and suffered no serious injuries. 

At the Belgian Grand Prix he reached Q3 for the first time with Williams, qualifying ninth and starting sixth due to grid penalties for other drivers. He finished the race tenth, scoring a point. Albon was forced to withdraw from the  after suffering from appendicitis and was replaced by Nyck de Vries. Williams later revealed that Albon had suffered anaesthetic-related respiratory failure following his surgery but was recovering well. He then retired on the opening lap of the  after a collision with Kevin Magnussen. An eighth-place start at the  failed to produce points with a thirteenth-place finish. He qualified eleventh at the  but a puncture caused his retirement from the sprint, demoting him to the back of the grid for the race. Albon ended the season nineteenth in the World Drivers' Championship, scoring 4 of Williams' 8 points.

2023
Albon's contract extension marked the end of his Red Bull affiliation, although he stated that he still maintained "a very close relationship" with the team. He qualified fifteenth at the season-opening , failing to set a time in Q2 due to front wing damage. He recovered in the race to score a point with tenth place.

DTM 

Albon participated in 14 out of 16 races of the 2021 Deutsche Tourenwagen Masters, with Formula E driver Nick Cassidy taking his place for the final two races at the Norisring. He was driving for the Italian outfit AF Corse alongside Formula 2 driver Liam Lawson, with the backing from Red Bull.

On 22 August 2021, Albon won his maiden DTM race at the Nürburgring, becoming the first Thai driver to win a DTM race.

Karting record

Karting career summary

Racing record

Racing career summary 

 Season still in progress.

Complete Eurocup Formula Renault 2.0 results 
(key) (Races in bold indicate pole position) (Races in italics indicate fastest lap)

Complete FIA Formula 3 European Championship results 
(key) (Races in bold indicate pole position) (Races in italics indicate fastest lap)

Complete Macau Grand Prix results

Complete GP3 Series results
(key) (Races in bold indicate pole position) (Races in italics indicate fastest lap)

Complete FIA Formula 2 Championship results
(key) (Races in bold indicate pole position) (Races in italics indicate points for the fastest lap of top ten finishers)

Complete Formula One results
(key) (Races in bold indicate pole position; races in italics indicate fastest lap)

 Did not finish, but was classified as he had completed more than 90% of the race distance.
 Season still in progress.

Complete Deutsche Tourenwagen Masters results 
(key) (Races in bold indicate pole position) (Races in italics indicate fastest lap)

Notes

References

External links

 
 

1996 births
Living people
Sportspeople from London
English racing drivers
Alex Albon
English expatriate sportspeople in Monaco
Alex Albon
English people of Thai descent
English Theravada Buddhists
English Buddhists
Alex Albon
Karting World Championship drivers
Formula Renault Eurocup drivers
Formula Renault 2.0 Alps drivers
Formula Renault 2.0 NEC drivers
FIA Formula 3 European Championship drivers
Thai GP3 Series drivers
FIA Formula 2 Championship drivers
Alex Albon
Toro Rosso Formula One drivers
Red Bull Formula One drivers
Deutsche Tourenwagen Masters drivers
EPIC Racing drivers
KTR drivers
Signature Team drivers
ART Grand Prix drivers
DAMS drivers
AF Corse drivers
Williams Formula One drivers
Hitech Grand Prix drivers